The crested bellowsfish or crested bellowfish, Notopogon lilliei, is a species of fish from the family Macroramphosidae.

This species has been found in the south western Pacific off the coasts of New Zealand and Victoria and Tasmania in south-eastern Australia; it has also been reported from the western Indian Ocean near KwaZulu Natal and in the south eastern Atlantic near the islands of Tristan da Cunha and Gough Island. The species was named for biologist D. G. Lillie.

References

 Tony Ayling & Geoffrey Cox, Collins Guide to the Sea Fishes of New Zealand,  (William Collins Publishers Ltd, Auckland, New Zealand 1982) 

Notopogon
Fish described in 1914